High Chaparral is a Wild West theme park and post-industrial museum of cultural artifacts and collectibles, located close to Värnamo, Sweden. It opened in 1966 and was founded by Bengt Erlandsson, more commonly known as "Big Bengt".

The park is located near Hillerstorp in Gnosjö Municipality and is close to E4 motorway and Swedish national road 27.

Big Bengt, the founder 
Bengt Erlandsson was born in 1922 in Brännehylte, Småland, Sweden. His parents owned a forest farm and a saw mill. His interest in the American frontier and Wild West was born from coming from a countryside where many had emigrated to America and from the stories they told. Erlandsson went to the United States himself in 1956 at age 34 and in four months touring covered . He came back to Sweden with a lot of impressions. When the Swedish national phone company had to get rid of 200,000 telephone poles, Erlandsson took the opportunity and constructed a western American style frontier fort and town with log cabins as it might have been used by the old United States Cavalry and U.S. Army in the Indian Wars on the western frontier in North America during the 19th century. When many people started to get curious about the place, he realized its commercial/tourist and historical purposes and possibilities. Similar to Walt Disney's construction of various Disneylands and Disney Worlds with "Frontierlands" portions built into the entertainment parks in several foreign countries decades later.

Bengt Erlandsson died in March 2016.

Park 
The park was opened in 1966. The theme park stages several stunt shows a day. It also has a steam train that runs through the park. There is both the classic Wild West section, an Indian themed area, a Mexican themed area, and a museum overflowing with cultural artifacts, old cars, machinery, and various Cold War oddities such as the bronze monster-size statue of Lenin expelled from Nowa Huta.

Following floods in January 2023, major parts of the park ended up underwater.

See also
Ponderosa Ranch

References

External links

 http://www.highchaparral.se - Official Website

Amusement parks in Sweden
Western (genre) theme parks
1966 establishments in Sweden
Buildings and structures in Jönköping County
Tourist attractions in Jönköping County
Amusement parks opened in 1966